Niastella populi  is a Gram-negative, strictly aerobic and non-motile bacterium from the genus of Niastella which has been isolated from soli from a Populus euphratica forest in Xinjiang in China.

References

External links
Type strain of Niastella populi at BacDive -  the Bacterial Diversity Metadatabase

Chitinophagia
Bacteria described in 2010